The following table presents a listing of Sudan's state governors.

Governors

Autonomous governments, regional authorities and other areas

See also
List of current heads of state and government
List of South Sudanese state governors
List of Saudi provinces governors 
List of Chad regions governors 
List of Centrafrican prefectures prefects

References

External links
Worldstatesmen.org
“Sudanese president appoints new governor for East Darfur”
“Republican Decrees Issued on Appointment of Social Welfare Minister and Two Walis”

Sudan
Governors